House of Buggin'  is a Latino-themed sketch comedy television show, which aired on Sunday night at 8:30 pm EST as a mid-season replacement from January to April 1995, starring John Leguizamo and Luis Guzmán. It was aired on the FOX Network, but removed from broadcasting schedules before the completion of the first season. According to Leguizamo's autobiography, the show was a replacement for In Living Color, using the same format, and was itself replaced by Mad TV.

Broadcast History/Ratings
The series primarily aired on Sundays at 8:30-9:00 pm (EST) on Fox.

<onlyinclude>

Episodes

Cancellation 
By the end of the ten-episode season, ratings declined by 50% from the premiere episode.  Fox suggested replacing the entire cast for the second season. Leguizamo refused, and the show was cancelled.

References

Notes

External links
 

1990s American sketch comedy television series
1995 American television series debuts
1995 American television series endings
Fox Broadcasting Company original programming
Television series by HBO Independent Productions
Latino sitcoms